Aimee Allison (born 1969) is the Founder of She the People, a national network elevating the political power of women of color.

She the People
In March 2018, Allison founded She the People to activate and mobilize women of color across the country in local and national politics and launched the inaugural She the People Summit, a national gathering of women of color transforming U.S. politics. In April 2019, Allison also organized the first presidential forum focused on women of color at Texas Southern University in Houston, TX. The forum featured Cory Booker, Julian Castro, Tulsi Gabbard, Kamala Harris, Amy Klobuchar, Beto O’Rourke, Bernie Sanders, and Elizabeth Warren.

In 2019, Allison also led listening sessions in battleground states to gather insights from women of color on the 2020 election.

Democracy in Color
Allison was the President of Democracy in Color, an organization that focuses on race, politics and the New American Majority and organized an event during the 2016 Democratic National Convention to highlight the strength and political vision of women of color in the Democratic Party, featuring Stacey Abrams and Nina Turner among others. She is also the host of the “Democracy in Color” podcast.

In 2017, Allison launched "Get in Formation," a national call for Black women to support Stacey Abrams in her race for governor of Georgia.

Early career
Beginning in September 2007, she was co-host of The Morning Show on Pacifica station KPFA, 94.1 FM in Berkeley, California. Allison was host of the San Francisco Bay Area Comcast NewsMakers show that aired on CNN Local Edition. Serving in the United States Army as a combat medic, Allison won an honorable discharge as a conscientious objector in the First Gulf War and was active in the peace movement. She is the co-author with David Solnit of the book Army of None: Strategies to Counter Military Recruitment, End War and Build a Better World which was published in 2007 by Seven Stories Press.  She's also a contributor to 10 Excellent Reasons Not to Join the Military.

Her writings have been featured in a wide range of publications, including the New York Times, Huffington Post, Essence, The Hill (newspaper), and Remezcla.

Education
Allison holds a B.A. in History from Stanford University and an M.A. in Education from the Stanford Graduate School of Education. She has lived in Oakland since 1991.

Personal life
Allison was raised in Antioch, California and lives in Oakland, California.

Works

References

External links

Aimee Allison's website

American pacifists
American radio personalities
American conscientious objectors
California Greens
American anti-war activists
African-American people in California politics
American community activists
Activists from the San Francisco Bay Area
Stanford University School of Humanities and Sciences alumni
Stanford Graduate School of Education alumni
Living people
1969 births
21st-century African-American politicians
21st-century American politicians
20th-century African-American people